Nicolae Papuc (born 6 February 1973) is a Romanian modern pentathlete. He represented Romania at the 2000 Summer Olympics held in Sydney, Australia in the men's modern pentathlon and he finished in 21st place.

References

External links 
 

1973 births
Living people
Romanian male modern pentathletes
Olympic modern pentathletes of Romania
Modern pentathletes at the 2000 Summer Olympics